Karen Leibovici is a French sailor born on 5 March 1971 in La Rochelle.

Biography
Karen's career remains marked by March 13, 2005: that day, at 9:04 p.m., she became the fourth female skipper to complete the Vendée Globe.

She was subsequently awarded the Medal of Honour called the Ordre du Mérite Maritime for her commitment to the protection of the environment.

Career highlights
1998:
 1st Mini Summer
1999:
 Mini-Transat: abandonment 
2000:
 1st of the Mini Barcelona
 2nd Triangle of the Sun
 1st Transmanche
2001
 9th Transat 6.50 (La Rochelle-Salvador de Bahia)
 1st Mini Fastnet
2002
 Record crossing of the English Channel aboard Adrien with Jean-Luc Van Den Heede
2004
 9th of the English Transat
2005
 13th in the Vendée Globe out of 20 starters, on Benefic, the oldest of the boats involved, the famous "Red Cigare" (the former VDH boat)
2006
 25th of the MAP trophy with the mini 6.50 tam tam No.546 in 2 j 03:27:51

Reference

1971 births
Living people
French female sailors (sport)
Sportspeople from La Rochelle
Officers of the Ordre du Mérite Maritime
IMOCA 60 class sailors
French Vendee Globe sailors
2004 Vendee Globe sailors
Vendée Globe finishers
Single-handed circumnavigating sailors